Barwa is a village in Shaheed Bhagat Singh Nagar district of Punjab State, India. The village is administrated by Sarpanch an elected representative of the village.

Demography 
As of 2011, Barwa has a total number of 261 houses and population of 1140 of which 560 include are males while 580 are females according to the report published by Census India in 2011. The literacy rate of Barwa is 82.19%, higher than the state average of 75.84%. The population of children under the age of 6 years is 90 which is 7.89% of total population of Barwa, and child sex ratio is approximately 837 as compared to Punjab state average of 846.

Most of the people are from Schedule Caste which constitutes 57.98% of total population in Barwa. The town does not have any Schedule Tribe population so far.

As per the report published by Census India in 2011, 321 people were engaged in work activities out of the total population of Barwa which includes 285 males and 36 females. According to census survey report 2011, 73.85% workers describe their work as main work and 26.15% workers are involved in Marginal activity providing livelihood for less than 6 months.

Education 
The village has a Punjabi medium, co-ed upper primary school founded in 2004 The schools provide mid-day meal which prepared in school premises as per Indian Midday Meal Scheme. the school provide free education to children between the ages of 6 and 14 as per Right of Children to Free and Compulsory Education Act.

KC Engineering College and Doaba Khalsa Trust Group Of Institutions are the nearest colleges.

Landmarks 
Badwal Mata Mandir, Barwa Mata Mandir, Badwal Jathere and Gurudwara Singh Sabha are the religious sites in Barwa.

Transport 

See also 
List of villages in India

References

External links 
 Tourism of Punjab 
 Census of Punjab
 Locality Based PINCode

Villages in Shaheed Bhagat Singh Nagar district